Taranipur is a village in Patharghata Gram Panchayat-II in Tehatta I CD Block in Tehatta subdivision of Nadia district. It is situated in between the river Jalangi and the border of Bangladesh.

Demographics
As per the 2011 Census of India, Taranipur Village has a total population of 7,162, of which 3,633 (51.73%) is males and 3,529 (49.27%) is females. The total number of literates in Tarnipur is 4,350(60.74% of the population over 6 years).

Transport
Krishnagar-Karimpur road or SH 11, running through the Taranipur village.

References 

Villages in Nadia district